Normandie is a community in Weldford Parish, located 2.25 km NW of Saint-Norbert, on the road to Ford Bank.

History

Normandie had a Post Office 1914-1958 and is generally considered part of Saint-Norbert.  Normandie was named for the French province of Normandie.

Notable people

See also
List of communities in New Brunswick

References
 

Settlements in New Brunswick
Communities in Kent County, New Brunswick